Lühe is a Samtgemeinde ("collective municipality") in the Altes Land west of Hamburg (Germany). Lühe has a population of about 10,000 and belongs to the district of Stade, Lower Saxony. The seat of the municipality is in Steinkirchen in Altes Land. Lühe is named after the river Lühe which runs through Guderhandviertel, Mittelnkirchen, Neuenkirchen in Altes Land and Steinkirchen.

Component municipalities
The Samtgemeinde Lühe consists of the following municipalities:

Grünendeich 
Guderhandviertel 
Hollern-Twielenfleth 
Mittelnkirchen 
Neuenkirchen in Altes Land 
Steinkirchen in Altes Land

Samtgemeinden in Lower Saxony
Populated riverside places in Germany
Populated places on the Elbe